Larapinta is an outer southern industrial suburb in the City of Brisbane, Queensland, Australia.

Larapinta is on the boundary with Logan City. The industrial area has become a new addition to the expansion of Brisbane's industry, including the purpose-built South Brisbane Industrial Park in nearby Heathwood.

Geography 
The Sydney–Brisbane rail corridor passes along the eastern border of the suburb. The Logan Motorway bisects the suburb in an east–west direction.

The north and west of the suburb is bounded by Oxley Creek.

In the south the Glider Forest Conservation Area has been created to protect a large tract of bushland.

History 
Larapinta means "flowing water" and was named due to the presence of Oxley Creek . Sand mining has occurred in the area, resulting in a change of course for the main stream of the creek.

At the  Larapinta had a population of 0 people.

References

Suburbs of the City of Brisbane
Populated places established in 1970
1970 establishments in Australia